The Miami Dolphins, a professional American football team based in Miami, Florida, are part of the Eastern Division of the American Football Conference (AFC) in the National Football League (NFL). The Dolphins were founded by Joseph Robbie and Danny Thomas in 1965. They began playing in the American Football League (AFL) as an expansion team in 1966 and joined the NFL as part of the AFL–NFL merger in 1967.

They first participated in the 1966 AFL Annual Player Selection Meeting, more commonly known as the NFL Draft. In the annual NFL Draft, each franchise seeks to add new players to its roster. Teams are ranked in reverse order based on the previous season's record, with the worst record picking first, the second worst picking second and so on. The two exceptions to this order are made for teams that appeared in the previous Super Bowl; the Super Bowl champion always picks 32nd, and the Super Bowl loser always picks 31st.  Teams have the option of trading away their picks to other teams for different picks, players, cash, or a combination thereof. Thus, it is not uncommon for a team's actual draft pick to differ from their assigned draft pick, or for a team to have extra or no draft picks in any round due to these trades.

As an expansion team in the AFL, the Dolphins were granted the first two picks in the 1966 American Football League Draft. They selected Jim Grabowski and Rick Norton with the first and second picks, respectively. The Dolphins' first selection as an NFL team was Bob Griese, a quarterback from Purdue. The team's most recent first-round selections were Jaylen Waddle, a wide receiver from Alabama and Jaelan Phillips, a defensive end from the University of Miami in 2021.

Key

Player selections

Footnotes

References 
General

Specific

Miami Dolphins

first-round draft picks